Shadow Lawn is a historic home located at Chase City, Mecklenburg County, Virginia. The original section dates to about 1834, with the main Italianate style front section designed by Jacob W. Holt and built in 1869–1870.  The house is two stories tall and three bays wide with a cross gable roof. It has a traditional central-passage, double-pile plan.

It was listed on the National Register of Historic Places in 1982.

References

Houses on the National Register of Historic Places in Virginia
Italianate architecture in Virginia
Houses completed in 1859
Houses in Mecklenburg County, Virginia
National Register of Historic Places in Mecklenburg County, Virginia